Hum & Strum Along with Chet Atkins is the tenth studio album by American guitarist Chet Atkins, released in 1959. This is a country-themed "listener participation" album in the vein of the "Sing Along With Mitch" series of albums by Mitch Miller. It came packaged in a gatefold with a lyric and guitar/ukulele chord booklet. It was reissued as an LP in 1961.

Reception

Allmusic music critic Richard S. Ginell wrote of the album; "An innocuous period piece through and through, notable only for some witty and elegant Atkins fills that somehow get by the concept."

Track listing

Side one
 "In the Good Old Summertime" (George Evans, Ren Shields) – 2:08
 "Beautiful Brown Eyes" (Alton Delmore, Arthur "Guitar Boogie" Smith) – 2:43
 "The Prisoner's Song" (Guy Massey) – 2:19
 "Titanic" (Dean Hudson) – 2:20
 "Tennessee Waltz" (Pee Wee King, Redd Stewart) – 2:03
 "Sweet Bunch of Daisies" (Atkins, Boudleaux Bryant) – 2:12

Side two
 "John Henry" (Traditional) – 2:23
 "Birmingham Jail" (Traditional) – 2:56
 "Music! Music! Music!" (Bernie Baum, Stephen Weiss) – 1:55
 "Cold, Cold Heart" (Hank Williams) – 2:29
 "Bill Bailey" (Hughie Cannon) – 2:15
 "Goodnight Irene" (Lead Belly, Alan Lomax) – 2:35

Personnel
Chet Atkins – guitar
Bob Ferris – engineer

References

1959 albums
Chet Atkins albums
Albums produced by Chet Atkins
RCA Victor albums
Sing-along albums